This is a list of films released by the British studio British Lion Films which was established in 1927 during the silent era. In its early years the company produced adaptations of Edgar Wallace crime novels, and later focused mainly on quota quickies. After the Second World War British Lion was acquired by Alexander Korda and it became a distribution outlet for independent British films with government backing.

While British Lion distributed many foreign films in Britain, such as a large number of Republic Pictures productions, these are not included in the list,

1920s

1930s

1940s

1950s

1960s

1970s

1980s

2010s

See also
 List of Gainsborough Pictures films
 List of Ealing Studios films
 List of Stoll Pictures films
 List of British and Dominions films
 List of Two Cities Films
 List of British National films
 List of General Film Distributors films
 List of Paramount British films

Bibliography
 Low, Rachael. History of the British Film, 1918–1929. George Allen & Unwin, 1971.
 Wood, Linda. British Films, 1927–1939. British Film Institute, 1986.

British Lion Films films
British Lion Films